Alma indomable (English title: Untamed Soul) is a telenovela created by Alberto Gómez, produced by Venevisión International and filmed in Miami, Florida. Univision aired Alma indomable from October 19, 2009 at the 1/12c timeslot.

Scarlet Ortiz and José Ángel Llamas starred as the protagonists, while Lilibeth Morillo and Luis José Santander starred as antagonists.

Plot
Alma Pérez is a diamond in the rough: 23 years old, without any education who lives with her cruel stepmother Rafaela "Fucha" Pérez and sister Jazmín Pérez. Destiny brings her to the hacienda of Patricio Sorrento, Las Brisas, where she begins to live as a guest. Unknown to her, she is actually the heiress to Patricio's fortune. Fucha, her adoptive grandmother was paid to raise Alma by her real grandmother Paula Romero.

At the hacienda, Alma meets Juan Pablo Robles, the administrator of the hacienda who lives with his mother Caridad Robles. He begins to teach Alma how to read and write. Alma and Juan Pablo immediately fall in love, but when she sees him kissing Dubraska Sorrento, she feels betrayed and leaves the hacienda. After some time, she comes back as a successful, rich and beautiful woman to claim her fortune and seek revenge on her enemies.

Esteban De la Vega is a rich man who also loves Alma and will do anything to have her. Together with his cousin Abigail Richardi, who is in love with Juan Pablo, they conspire to separate the two.

Cast

Scarlet Ortiz as Alma Pérez / Alma Sorrento
José Ángel Llamas as Juan Pablo Robles
Lilibeth Morillo as Abigail Richardi
Luis José Santander as Esteban De la Vega
Víctor González as Nicanor Sánchez
Lisette Morelos as Monica Sorrento
Karina Mora as Dubraska Sorrento
Oscar Corbella as Patricio Sorrento
Patty Álvarez as Gertrudis Sorrento
Leonardo Daniel as Rogelio Sorrento
Yul Bürkle as Fernando Ríos
Rodolfo Jiménez as León Ríos
Gabriel Parisi as Federico Urbaneja
Juan Vidal as Raúl Urbaneja
Adita Riera as Caridad Vda. de Robles
Martha Picanes as Paula Romero
Esperanza Rendón as Cecilia Ocampo
Franklin Virgüez as Danilo Ocampo
Alan as Alberto "Beto" Ocampo / Alberto De la Vega Antúnez
Maite Embil as Amanda Rosales / Amparo "La Españolita"
Isabel Moreno as Rafaela "Fucha" Pérez
Tali Duclaud as Jazmín Pérez de Ocampo
Kenya Hijuelos as Susana "Susy"
Vivian Ruiz as Otilia Bezaes
Nelida Ponce as Carmela "Carmelita" Ríos
Julio Capote as Ramón Olivares
Yami Quintero as Luisa Olivares
Ezequiel Montalt as Mauricio Lira
Roberto Levermann as Theofilo "Theo"
Yadhira Santana as Guadalupe "Lupe" Fuentes
Martha Pabón as Rosa Angélica Antúnez
Nury Flores as Madre Superiora
Alí Sánchez as Sabrina Ortiz "Azul"
Verónica Noboa as Venus Estrella

References

External links

2009 telenovelas
2009 American television series debuts
2010 American television series endings
2009 Venezuelan television series debuts
2010 Venezuelan television series endings
Television shows set in Miami
Television shows filmed in Miami
Venevisión telenovelas
Spanish-language American telenovelas
Venezuelan telenovelas